Selden G. Hooper (25 December 1904 – 7 February 1976) was the only admiral of the United States Navy to be convicted by court-martial.

In U.S. V. Hooper, 26 CMR 417 (CMA, 1958), Hooper was tried by general court-martial for sodomy, conduct of a nature to bring discredit upon the Armed Forces, and conduct unbecoming an officer and a gentleman. Hooper had retired as a rear admiral in 1950, and the acts for which he was tried were committed after he had retired. The defense questioned the military court's jurisdiction, but the court explained that "retired personnel are a part of the land or naval forces." The military retiree, then, is not simply a civilian. The court held that the admiral was "a part of the military forces of this country." He was described as "an officer of the Navy of the United States, entitled to wear the uniform and to draw pay as such." He was convicted and sentenced to dismissal and forfeiture of all pay and allowances.

Hooper was the only flag officer of the U.S. Navy to be convicted by court-martial, and strictly speaking, the only Navy flag officer to ever be tried by court-martial.  In 1995, Everett L. Greene was acquitted of sexual harassment and other related charges; he had been selected for promotion to rear admiral, but was still a captain when he was tried.

References 
 This article is based on information in the public record published by the United States Navy's Judge Advocate General Corps.

External links
  274 F.2d 429 Hooper v. Hartman, December 4, 1959
  326 F.2d 982 Hooper v. the United States, January 24, 1964

1904 births
1976 deaths
United States Navy admirals
United States Navy personnel who were court-martialed
United States Navy personnel of World War II